Breaking Point is an album by the English electronic dance music group Lunatic Calm, released in 2002. This was to be their last album before their split in 2003.

Track listing

Personnel

Lunatic Calm are
 Simon "sHack" Shackleton -  lead vocals, keyboards, guitars, drum programming
 Howard "Howie" Saunders - keyboards, guitars, bass
 Jez Noble - drums, percussion ("Nobody")

Additional team
 Ronnie Archer - bass ("Resurrection City")
 John Matthias - string arrangements ("Nobody")
 Chris Rogers - electronic drums, programming, ("Beatbox Burning") engineering
 Mandy Parnell - mastering
 The Luna Module - recording studio

Lunatic Calm albums
2002 albums